Peñas Chatas is a corregimiento in Ocú District, Herrera Province, Panama with a population of 1,778 as of 2010. Its population as of 1990 was 1,836; its population as of 2000 was 1,811.

References

Corregimientos of Herrera Province